Community is a social marketing startup that connects fans with celebrities, through a phone number run by Community. Celebrities leak or share their phone number as if it's their personal cell phone. It is based in Santa Monica, California.

The cofounders are Matthew Peltier and Josh Rosenheck, who pivoted from their previous app, Shimmur, which was in a Techstars incubator in 2017. Barry Steinglass, formerly CTO of Hulu, is the CTO.

The service was launched in July 2019 with investments from Ashton Kutcher and Guy Oseary. Maverick's Chief Impact Officer Molly DeWolf Swenson brought Community to Oseary after trialing the texting platform with G-Eazy. At the time Barack Obama joined Community, on September 23, 2020, the company had amassed nearly 20 million members.

Notable users
 Barack Obama
Misha Collins
 Jake Paul
 Marshmello
 P. Diddy
 Scooter Braun
 Paul McCartney
 Ashton Kutcher
 Karlie Kloss
 Gregg Sulkin
 Gary Vaynerchuk
 Amy Schumer
 Sophia Bush
 OneRepublic
 Jennifer Lopez
 Guapdad 4000
 Diplo (placed the phone number on a billboard in Hollywood)
 Summer Walker
 Tory Lanez
 Tom Felton
 Ellen DeGeneres
 Mark Cuban
 Kerry Washington
 Pod Save America
 Jonas Brothers
 DDG
 SuperM
 Wax Motif
 Jennifer Lopez
 Alex Rodriguez
 Ava DuVernay
 John Legend
 Jim Gaffigan
 Ian Somerhalder
 Lele Pons
 Dream (YouTuber)

See also
 Katy Perry, who accidentally shared her phone number
 Escapex
 Cameo (website)

References

External links
 

Companies based in Santa Monica, California
Celebrity fandom
American companies established in 2019